An Abeng is an animal horn or musical instrument in the language of the Akan people. The word abeng is from the Twi language in modern-day Ghana, it  is a commonly used word in the Caribbean, especially Jamaica, and the instrument is associated with the Maroon people.

The Maroons of Jamaica used the horn to communicate over great distances in ways that couldn't be understood by people outside the community.

Today the abeng is made from cattle horn and is still used in Maroon communities on ceremonial occasions or to announce important news.

See also
Sneng a similar side-blown horn in Cambodia

References

External links

Article with details on Abeng

Animal products
Natural horns and trumpets